Sir Reginald Alfred Hibbert,  (21 February 1922 – 5 October 2002) was a British diplomat.

Career
Reginald Hibbert was educated at Queen Elizabeth's School, Barnet, and Worcester College, Oxford, where he took a war-shortened course in modern history. After graduating in 1942 he volunteered for the army and was commissioned into the 4th Hussars (a tank regiment). In 1943 he was seconded to the Special Operations Executive and was parachuted into Albania, where he served as a liaison officer first with the nationalists, and then with the communist partisans. In 1944 he rejoined his regiment in Italy, serving as a troop commander until demobilisation. After a further year at Oxford learning Russian he entered the Foreign Service in 1946. In that year, before embarking on a more normal career, he had what he subsequently called a 'highly astonishing pupillage' as a note-taker and occasional interpreter in Russian for Ernest Bevin, the foreign secretary, in Moscow, Paris, and New York.

Hibbert served in Bucharest, Vienna, Guatemala, Ankara and Brussels before volunteering for the post of Chargé d'Affaires in Ulan Bator, Mongolia, 1964–66. He then took a sabbatical research fellowship at Leeds University before being appointed in 1967 to the office of the Commissioner-General in South-East Asia in Singapore, first as head of chancery and then as political adviser to the Commander-in-Chief, Far East. He was Minister at Bonn 1972–75; Assistant Under-Secretary of State, Foreign and Commonwealth Office 1975–76; Deputy Under-Secretary of State 1976–79; and finally Ambassador to France 1979–82. While Ambassador to France, he was known to be abrasive but his honesty was respected.

After retiring from the Diplomatic Service, Hibbert was Director of the Ditchley Foundation 1982–87. He was a Visiting Fellow of Nuffield College, Oxford, 1984–88, and Senior Associate Member, St Antony's College, Oxford, 1983–88. He was Chairman of the Franco-British Society 1990–95; President of the Féderation Britannique des Alliances Françaises, 1997–99; President of the Albanian Society of Britain, 1996–2000.

Hibbert was appointed CMG in 1966 and knighted KCMG in 1979 and GCMG in 1982. He was appointed Commandeur in the Légion d'Honneur in 1995. He was made an Honorary Resident Fellow of University College of Swansea in 1988 and an Honorary Fellow of Worcester College, Oxford, in 1991.

Publications
 The Albanian National Liberation Struggle: the bitter victory, Pinter Publishers, London, 1991. 
 The Kosovo question: origins, present complications and prospects, David Davies Memorial Institute (Occasional paper no.11), London, 1999
 Letters from Mongolia (with Ann Hibbert), Radcliffe Press, London, 2005.

References

 HIBBERT, Sir Reginald (Alfred), Who Was Who, A & C Black, * 1920–2008; online edn, Oxford University Press, Dec 2007. Retrieved 22 February 2012
 Hibbert, Sir Reginald Alfred (1922–2002) by Sir Alan Campbell, Oxford Dictionary of National Biography, Oxford University Press, Jan 2006; online edn, Oct 2009. Retrieved 22 February 2012
 Obituary: Sir Reginald Hibbert, The Guardian, London, 15 October 2002
 Appreciation: Sir Reginald Hibbert, The Guardian, London, 16 October 2002
 Sir Reginald Hibbert, Obituary, The Telegraph, London, 9 October 2002

External links
 Interview with Sir Reginald Alfred Hibbert & transcript, British Diplomatic Oral History Programme, Churchill College, Cambridge, 1997

1922 births
2002 deaths
People educated at Queen Elizabeth's Grammar School for Boys
Alumni of Worcester College, Oxford
Knights Grand Cross of the Order of St Michael and St George
Ambassadors of the United Kingdom to France
Commandeurs of the Légion d'honneur
British expatriates in Austria
British expatriates in Romania
British expatriates in Guatemala
British expatriates in Turkey
British expatriates in Belgium